Lost Cabin is an unincorporated community in Fremont County, Wyoming, United States.

History
A post office called Lost Cabin was established in 1886, and remained in operation until 1966. The community received its name from a pioneer incident in which a party of prospectors escaped from Indians, only to find later their cabins had disappeared from the site.

In popular culture
In his poem The Ballad of Jesus Ortiz, Dana Gioia describes how his great-grandfather, a Mexican immigrant from Sonora, worked as a Wild West cow-puncher and was later murdered by a disgruntled and racist patron while working as a saloon keeper at Lost Cabin in 1910.

References

Unincorporated communities in Fremont County, Wyoming